Connetta is the second studio album of Japanese singer and actress Ami Suzuki on the Avex Trax label. It is the first album released from the "Join" project of Suzuki, that consisted of collaborations with different artists and different genres.

Background
Connetta was first album from the "Join" project of Suzuki, which consisted of collaborations with different artists and different musical genres. However, the first singles released were not originally part of the "Join" project, since this idea originally started at the beginning of 2007. Short time after the release of the first Avex album, Around The World, Suzuki introduced her then new song Fantastic at the encore of her 2005 live tour. The song was later released as a single in February 2006. "Crystal" and "To Be Free" were included in the Christmas single Little Crystal released in December 2005. The subsequent singles released in 2006, "Alright!" and "Like a Love?", were released as solo singles as well, though the later became noticed by the media mainly because it was the first musical composition made by Ai Otsuka for another artist besides herself. The first proper "Join" singles were "O.K. Funky God", "Peace Otodoke!!" and "Sore mo Kitto Shiawase", which were released between February 27 and March 14, 2007.

For the different collaborations Suzuki worked for the first time in her career with indie pop (Hideki Kaji, Ayano Tsuji), indie rock (Scoobie Do, Northern Bright) and experimental (Buffalo Daughter) artists, making this album the most risky in terms of music, as Connetta went a little farther from the regular J-Pop genre she used to sing through all her career.

Track listing

Singles

Charts

Short drama: Join
The "Join" project was not only related to music. A short story entitled "Join" was also made, written and directed by Kazuya Shiraishi, and starring Suzuki and Hiroyuki Onoue. Each one of the three "Join" CD singles "O.K. Funky God", "Peace Otodoke!!" and "Sore mo Kitto Shiawase" included the narration drama tracks "7 Days Before", "The Days Before" and "The Days After", which served as preludes for the 30-minute short film which was later included in the bonus DVD of the album (in the A Type version).

The short film tells the story of an art student (Ami) who is worried because she has not inspiration for drawing a new painting. Her classmate (Kōji, played by Onoue) invites her to help painting a mural for a senpai, and once she gets there and starts helping something begins to change within her.

Some of the musicians that collaborated in the Connetta album made cameo appearances in the short film, like the members of THC!!, MoOog Yamamoto from Buffalo Daughter, and Hitoshi Arai from Northern Bright. Arai even performed an acoustic version of "Everything To Me" in a scene.

Credits
Ami Suzuki - Ami
Hiroyuki Onoue： - Kōji
Keisuke Horibe - Kamiki
Ryu Morioka - Ryu
Ayaka Komatsu - Yukako
Narumi Konno - Haruka
Kaohiko Kaoda - Yamadera
Shiho Harumi - Kobayatsu

Personnel
Director, Script: Kazuya Shiraishi
Photography: Atsushi Fukumoto
Illumination: Tokumitsu Ichikawa
Art: Ryuji Noguchi
Audio Recording: Takenori Misawa
Stylist: Mie Egashira
Hair & Make-up: Yuki Asano
Assistant director: Kaoru Ogino
Production Chief: Yuya Satoyoshi
Line Producer: Hijiri Taguchi
Associate Producer: Shinsuke Higuchi

2007 albums
Ami Suzuki albums
Avex Group albums